Masterpiece is a 2000 Spanish comedy-drama film directed and written by David Trueba. It stars Ariadna Gil, Santiago Segura and Pablo Carbonell.

Plot 
The plot tracks two male friends, a film director and a wannabe leading man, preparing a musical film, intended to star Amanda Castro, a Spanish cinema diva at a low ebb. Upon the rejection from the latter, the two friends kidnap Castro and force her to star in the film.

Cast

Production 
The film was produced by Fernando Trueba PC and Buenavida producciones, with the participation of TVE, Vía Digital and Amiguetes Entertainment. Shooting locations included the mountains of the Madrid region.

Release 
The screenplay was penned by David Trueba. Owing to superficial similarities of the plot with Cecil B. Demented, lawyers representing the latter film threatened to take legal measures. Distributed by Lolafilms, the film was theatrically released in Spain on 27 October 2000. It grossed €1,056,713 (249,699 admissions).

Reception 
Jonathan Holland of Variety considered that despite being "dangerously straddled between genres in a way that could confuse audiences" the film "manages to be moving, funny and thought-provoking".

The review in Fotogramas rated the film 2 out of 5 stars drawing out Santiago Segura's character ("simply superb") as a man evicted from reality, as the best thing about the film while considering that there are too many characters who contribute nothing as the worst element of the film.

Accolades 

|-
| align = "center" rowspan = "3" | 2001 || rowspan = "3" | 15th Goya Awards || Best Supporting Actor || Luis Cuenca ||  || rowspan = "3" | 
|-
| Best New Actor || Pablo Carbonell || 
|-
| Best Special Effects || Emilio Ruiz del Río, Alfonso Nieto, Raúl Romanillos, Pau Costa || 
|}

See also 
 List of Spanish films of 2000

References 

2000 comedy-drama films
Spanish comedy-drama films
Films shot in the Community of Madrid
2000s Spanish-language films
2000s Spanish films